"Call Me Lightning" is a song written by Pete Townshend, guitarist of the British rock band The Who. Townshend first recorded a home demo of the song in 1964. The Who's recording was a single released in March 1968 and it later appeared on the Who's fourth American album Magic Bus: The Who on Tour.

In the United States "Call Me Lightning" was the follow-up single to the Top 10 hit "I Can See for Miles" and reached No. 40 on the Billboard Hot 100 on 4 May 1968, their 16th most successful single on the Hot 100.  Billboard described the single as a "pulsating rocker with a happy beat."  Cash Box called it "an imaginative blend of rock-blues and rag" and praised "the potent group performance." The song features a prominent bass solo by John Entwistle. A promo film was made, and this later was included in the 1979 documentary The Kids Are Alright. "Call Me Lightning" was released in the United Kingdom as the B-side of the single "Dogs".

The US B-side, "Dr. Jekyll and Mr. Hyde", had been considered as a possible A-side single release, along with "Call Me Lightning," as the B-side. "Call Me Lightning" received a mediocre reception from Who fans, and biographer John Atkins feels that "Dr. Jekyll and Mr. Hyde" was a better song, even though its horror film imagery was unsuitable for a single.  Cash Box called "Dr. Jekyll and Mr. Hyde" a "psychedelified throbber on the lid that could attract added attention."

The song was behind the naming of the rock group Call Me Lightning.

Chart performance

References 
Citations

Bibliography
 
 

The Who songs
1968 songs
Songs written by Pete Townshend
Song recordings produced by Kit Lambert